Pescafresh is a fresh seafood home delivery service based in Mumbai, India. The Company was started in 2004 by Sangram Sawant.

History
Pescafresh started delivering fresh seafood in July 2004. It initially delivered in the areas between South Mumbai to Andheri on Western Suburbs to Sion on central suburbs. Since then it has expanded its services and has started delivering across Mumbai and claims to have reached more than 20,000 households across the city through its home delivery services.

In 2015 Pescafresh partnered with Star Bazaar and Tesco to start one of its kind Gourmet seafood counter. The store branded as Pescafresh Gourmet started operations at Star Bazaar Andheri in June 2015. In its Gourmet store Pescafresh offers Fresh Norwegian Pink Salmon and Himalayan Trout to its retail consumers.

Products
Pescafresh sells over 45 varieties of Fish such as Pomfret, Indian Salmon/Rawas, Kingfish, Seabass, Redsnapper, Tiger prawn, Lobster, Crab and many other local varieties. Pescafresh also partnered with Loch Duart to get fresh Scottish Salmon to India. Its gourmet range also includes Norwegian Halibut, Himalayan Trout and Fresh Pink Salmon that is imported from Norway.

Operations
As of June 2015, Pescafresh operates in 4 cities in India: Mumbai, Bangalore and Delhi. It currently operates with hypermarket and supermarket chains such as ABRL More, Godrej Natures Basket, TATA Trents Gourmet west, TATA Star Bazaar and Le Marche, however the home delivery services are only available in Mumbai.

Funding
In February 2014 Pescafresh raised funding from Blume Ventures. It was a lead investment accompanied by Orios Venture Partners as co investors.
It is currently in the process of raising its second round of funding in the range of $4–6 million.
The company plans to invest 25-30 Crores in next 3 years to consolidate its operations.

Online venture
In 2015 Pescafresh remade their website to make it an online marketplace for local and international seafood. The website will offer consumers local and international seafood varieties for home delivery. Pescafresh also plans to create a mobile app on Android and iOS platforms.

References

External links

2004 establishments in Maharashtra
Retail companies established in 2004
Food and drink companies based in Mumbai
Fish processing companies
Seafood companies of Asia
Fishing in India
Food and drink companies of India